Bolton South East is a constituency represented in the House of Commons of the UK Parliament since 2010 by Yasmin Qureshi of the Labour Party.

Constituency profile
The seat covers the south part of Bolton town and its suburbs around the M61 motorway. Towns such as Farnworth and Kearsley are former mining areas. Residents are generally poorer than the UK average, though the Hulton ward is more Conservative, and there are smaller villages and suburban areas such as Ringley, and green spaces, such as the 750-acre Moses Gate Country Park.

Boundaries 

1983–2010: The Metropolitan Borough of Bolton wards of Burnden, Daubhill, Derby, Farnworth, Harper Green, Kearsley, and Little Lever.

2010–present: The Metropolitan Borough of Bolton wards of Farnworth, Great Lever, Harper Green, Hulton, Kearsley, Little Lever and Darcy Lever, and Rumworth.

Following a boundary reorganization in the early 1980s, parts of the former constituencies of Bolton East and Farnworth were combined to create this constituency, with effect from the 1983 general election.

Members of Parliament

Elections 
This area has elected Labour candidates to be MP since its creation in 1983, with majorities of more than 15%; therefore, until 2019, it could have been seen as a safe seat. Unlike the other two Bolton seats, it has remained safely Labour. This is also reflected by the majority of wards returning councillors for Labour; a notably stronger ward for the Conservative Party to date has been Hulton, which has often returned Conservative councillors.

Elections in the 2010s

Elections in the 2000s

Elections in the 1990s

Elections in the 1980s

See also 
 List of parliamentary constituencies in Greater Manchester

Notes

References

External links 
nomis Constituency Profile for Bolton South East — presenting data from the ONS annual population survey and other official statistics.

Parliamentary constituencies in Greater Manchester
Constituencies of the Parliament of the United Kingdom established in 1983
Politics of the Metropolitan Borough of Bolton
Parliamentary constituencies in North West England